L'Aldea is a municipality in the comarca of the Baix Ebre in Catalonia, Spain. It was created in 1983 from parts of the municipality of Tortosa. It is situated on the left bank of the Ebre at the start of the delta. The town is served by the A-7 autopista and the N-340 road, and has a station on the RENFE railway line between Tarragona and Valencia.

References

 Panareda Clopés, Josep Maria; Rios Calvet, Jaume; Rabella Vives, Josep Maria (1989). Guia de Catalunya, Barcelona: Caixa de Catalunya.  (Spanish).  (Catalan).

External links
Official website 
 Government data pages 

Municipalities in Baix Ebre
Populated places in Baix Ebre